Sergei Valeryevich Sokolov (born 23 September 1980) is a former Russian professional footballer.

He made his debut in the Russian Premier League in 2002 for FC Shinnik Yaroslavl.

References

1980 births
Sportspeople from Pskov
Living people
Russian footballers
Association football defenders
Russian Premier League players
Russian expatriate footballers
Expatriate footballers in Latvia
FC Shinnik Yaroslavl players
FC Fakel Voronezh players
FK Rīga players
Russian expatriate sportspeople in Latvia
FC Mordovia Saransk players